Clara 't Roen (died 1524, Aalst, Belgium), was a Flemish Lutheran.

In 1524 she was convicted of heresy and burned alive at the Grote Markt, the main square in Aalst, Belgium.

She was the first woman to be executed in the Southern-Netherlands (modern day Belgium) for being a Protestant.

A wheat beer has been named after Clara 't Roen.

In 2020 it was decided the city of Aalst is going to name a street after her name.

References

1523 deaths
16th-century executions
People executed for heresy
People executed by burning
Victims of the Inquisition